The Cut is a shallow, rock-strewn channel between Babe Island and the west side of the entrance to Cobblers Cove, along the north coast of South Georgia. Charted and named in 1929 by DI personnel.

References

Cut, The